On 26 October 1992 the London Ambulance Service started to use a new computer-assisted dispatch (CAD) system, known as LASCAD. Poorly designed and implemented, its introduction led to significant delays in the assigning of ambulances, with anecdotal reports of 11-hour waits. Media reports at the time claimed that up to 30 people may have died as a result of the chaos, despite a lack of evidence. The then-chief executive, John Wilby, resigned shortly afterwards. This failure is often cited in case studies of poor engineering management.

See also 

 List of failed and overbudget custom software projects
 Software crisis

References

Further reading 
 

Custom software projects